Aminoacetone is the simplest monopeptide with the formula CH3C(O)CH2NH2.  Although stable in the gaseous form, once condensed it reacts with itself. The protonated derivative forms stable salts, e.g. aminoacetone hydrochloride ([CH3C(O)CH2NH3]Cl)).  The semicarbazone of the hydrochloride is another bench-stable precursor. Aminoacetone is a metabolite that is implicated in the biosynthesis of methylglyoxal.

See also
 Propanolamines
 Aminoaldehydes and aminoketones

References

Amines
Ketones